Spring Grove Cemetery is a cemetery on Main Street in the Clay-Arsenal neighborhood of Hartford, Connecticut.  Established in 1845, it is one of the city's oldest cemeteries, and its first private non-sectarian cemetery.  Its burials include a number of the city's high-profile civic and business leaders, as well as a substantial indigent population, and artist Frederic Edwin Church.  It was listed on the National Register of Historic Places in 2011.

Description and history
Spring Grove Cemetery is located north of downtown Hartford, on the west side of Main Street between Mahl Avenue and Capen Street in the Clay-Arsenal neighborhood. It is accessed via a wrought iron archway on Main Street, which provides access to its network of circulating roads. Those roads are laid out in a basically rectilinear grid, and are finished in a combination of pavement, gravel, and grass. The oldest monument is that of the Page family, and is dated 1845. Its basic layout is little altered since its founding, and it retains most of its 19th-century features; a memorial chapel built in 1884 was destroyed by fire in 1904.

The land on which the cemetery was established was farmland owned by the Page family when Stephen Page buried his wife there in 1845.  The Pages then proceeded to sell burial plots (in contrast to typical cemetery practice of selling a right to interment) to others.  In 1864 a number of plot owners banded together to purchase the entire cemetery, establishing the non-profit association that now manages the property three years later.  In 1884, the association hired landscape designer Thomas Brown McClunnie to lay out the cemetery's northwest quadrant.  In contrast to the rural cemetery movement, McClunnie's parklike setting emphasized a simple rectangular layout, rather than winding lanes that conformed to local topography.

Notable burials 
 Frances Ellen Burr (1831-1923)
 Frederic Edwin Church (1826–1900)
 Ezra Clark Jr. (1813–1896)
 Laurent Clerc (1785–1869)
 Henry C. Deming (1815–1872)
 William W. Eaton (1816–1898)
 E. Hart Fenn (1856–1939)
 Lydia Sigourney (1791–1865)
 Henry Clay Work (1832–1884)

See also
 National Register of Historic Places listings in Hartford, Connecticut

References

External links

 
 

Cemeteries on the National Register of Historic Places in Connecticut
Queen Anne architecture in Connecticut
Buildings and structures in Hartford, Connecticut
Cemeteries in Hartford County, Connecticut
National Register of Historic Places in Hartford, Connecticut
Buildings and structures completed in 1844
Historic districts in Connecticut